Popeye: Rush for Spinach is a Game Boy Advance video game based on the comic strip of same name created by E. C. Segar, licensed from King Features Entertainment. It was developed by French studio Magic Pockets and published by Namco in 2005, and Atari Europe in 2006.

Plot
The evil Sea Hag has stolen the world supply of spinach. Popeye, Olive Oyl, Bluto, and Wimpy must travel through time and space to put an end to her plans.

Gameplay
Adventure: Compete in a series of races with a storyline.
Challenge: Compete against each character on each level
Quick Rush: Race on one level.
Time Rush: Race alone against the clock.
Team Rush: Compete with a human opponent.

Reception

Popeye: Rush for Spinach received negative reviews.

References

2005 video games
Atari games
Dinosaurs in video games
Game Boy Advance games
Game Boy Advance-only games
Multiplayer and single-player video games
Namco games
Video games about time travel
Video games based on Popeye
Popeye
Video games developed in France
Video games scored by Frédéric Motte
Magic Pockets games